IDOLS Ft (Full name: Idol Studio Ft; abbr. IDFT) is a Chinese idol girl group based on the Internet, which is operated by Shanghai Star48 Culture & Media Group Co., ltd. and established on January 19, 2019. Currently, the group consists of 88 members transferred from the other girl groups of SNH48 Group.

Overview 
IDOLS Ft is an idol girl group based on the Internet operated by Shanghai Star48 Culture & Media Group Co., ltd. According to the official introduction, the members would mainly interact with their fans on social media developed by the operator itself and the third-party developers. Moreover, the operator introduced a selecting system, allowing qualified members to become members of SNH48 or its sister groups.

History 
On January 19, 2019, Star48 announced the recombination plan of SNH48 Group, including the foundation of IDOLS Ft. All of the founding members were transferred from the other girl groups of SNH48 Group.

Members 
Currently, the girl group consists of 88 members, including 9 past members of SNH48, 14 past members of BEJ48, 12 past members of GNZ48, 27 past members of SHY48, and 26 past members of CKG48.

Current members

Past members

Controversies 
The nature of this girl group, as well as what its members would mainly do, has raised up large controversies by Chinese netizens. Some hold the opinion that Star48, the operator of this girl group, "transformed the idols into online streamers," and some other netizens rebuked the operator, saying that "the fans who spent their money for supporting their idols, and then received the bad news that the idols who they support should start their new career as streamers for the reason that the teams they once belonged to were dismissed, would never feel happy no matter who he/she is."

When responding to the inquiries of the mass media, Star48 said the group is aimed at "facilitating the interactions between members and fans, as well as allowing the latter to participate in the process of bringing up the former," and pointed out that how the group runs is constitutionally the same as reality competitions. Plus, it stated that the members would have possibilities to transfer to SNH48, BEJ48, or GNZ48 according to their performances and popularity.

Notes

References

External links 
 Official website

SNH48 Group